Johnny Rodgers (born John Daniel Rodgers; June 5, 1974) is an American singer-songwriter, pianist, Broadway star, and recording
artist whom The New York Times described as an entertainer "[who] can't be found anywhere else"  with "fused elements of Billy Joel, Peter Allen and Johnny Mercer."

Biography 
Johnny Rodgers was born and grew up in Miami, FL.  Musical performance and stage productions were things he really liked early in life (and still does!). He attributes his grandmother's piano playing side by side as what started him down the music path as a youngster.  Grandma Brown, who always wanted to be a Ziegfeld Girl, picked out melodies on the piano for four-year-old Johnny to sing. K-K-K-Katy, beautiful Katy/You're the only g-g-g-girl that I adore (Geoffrey O'Hara) rang through the Rodgers house in what one can only imagine were tenuous high pitched tones.  Beginning in 7th grade, then high school, Johnny took ballet, tap (his parents set up a piece of plywood on the grass so he could practice) and jazz dance, voice, and finally found his way back to piano. His teacher, Mrs. Warren, assigned Bach. Johnny would show up with The Root Beer Rag by Billy Joel or an Elton John number. Every year he'd perform in musicals. Paula Wayne, who'd starred in Golden Boy (Lee Adams/Charles Strouse) with Sammy Davis Jr., was a valued mentor. At Carnegie Mellon Pre-College Summer Program, Johnny wrote his first song, We May Be Young, But We're Not Blind. He still excels in love songs.

Johnny attended New World School of the Arts in Miami and started college with a scholarship to Florida State's prestigious Musical Theater program.  Unfortunately, the head of the program was on sabbatical, Johnny felt the syllabus was redundant, and— he was lonely.  Back to Miami for a year at community college and then The Jazz Program at the University of Miami. He eventually followed one of his instructors to and graduated from Western Michigan University.

Career Hi-lights

U.S. Department of State Tours
Johnny Rodgers tours as Ambassador of American Music around the world on behalf of the U.S. State Department:

2010 - Southeast Asia and the Pacific Islands including Fiji, Papua New Guinea, Singapore, Cambodia, Malaysia, and Philippines

2011 - Middle East and North Africa.  Performances and workshops in Bahrain, Jordan, United Arab Emirates, Djibouti, and Egypt

2012 - Malaysia.   A special invitation from the Embassy to perform at the KK Kota Kinabalu Jazz Festival and other events.

2013 - Russia.  Performances and workshops in Tula, Kaluga, Tomsk, Moscow, Sochi and Yaroslavl

2014 - Russia.  St. Petersburg and Moscow for The Triumph of Jazz festival hosted by Igor Butman

2014 - Malaysia. US Embassy and the US Department of State's American Music Abroad tour in Malaysia. (with special guest Michelle Lambert).

Liza Minnelli tours
Liza Minnelli met Johnny while he was entertaining at lyricist Fred Ebb's Christmas party in 2002.  She recognized Johnny's talent taking him on her world tours as her pianist and then as featured singer, dancer, pianist, and songwriter in the Tony Award-winning Liza's at The Palace...!, which played on Broadway in 2009/2010 and now shows on PBS television.  Johnny co-wrote the featured song "I Would Never Leave You" and is included on the show's DVD release as well as the Grammy-nominated CD.

Johnny Rodgers Band 
Johnny Rodgers Band (New York, NY) came together in New York City in 2003 and its mission is to bring musical depth to new, original songs. They are masters of an array of styles ranging from pop to jazz to classic rock. Music from the Johnny Rodgers Band provides a guided tour of Americana pop, from the piano-driven energy of rock and roll, to the supreme sophistication of jazz. This ensemble cultivates connections with audiences through performances, discussions, demonstrations, and exchange. The Johnny Rodgers Band has performed and recorded with artists such as Liza Minnelli, Michael Feinstein, Randy Brecker, and Tom Harrell, among others. Besides their own award winning recordings, this ensemble has been featured on recordings that celebrate Maury Yeston and Jule Styne. The American Society of Composers, Authors and Publishers (ASCAP) selected The Johnny Rodgers Band to interpret and perform the music of Billy Joel in a command performance for the "Piano Man" himself in The Allen Room at Frederick P. Rose Hall, home of Jazz at Lincoln Center.  They have also been selected as Music Ambassadors for the U.S. Department of State and Jazz at Lincoln Center's Rhythm Road international music tour and other cultural exchange programs.

Featuring:  	Johnny Rodgers – piano/vocals

		Brian Glassman – bass

		Danny Mallon – drums

		Joe Ravo – guitar

Musical theatre projects
Motherhood: The Musical.  Musical Director, Orchestrator, Arranger for this successful touring off-broadway production that debuted in 2010. He is also Produced the original cast album and is co-writer on 5 of the musical's songs.

Liberace The Musical.  Composer and Lyricist with rights holder Barbara Carole Sickmen.   Johnny's work started in 2011 on this new Broadway project about the life of Liberace.

Firecracker Jack.  Part of this musical was workshopped with ASCAP in New York City in 2010.  This original work co-written with Nathan Crone is not yet completed but is an original musical with baseball prowess at the center of the story.

Discography

Johnny Rodgers/Johnny Rodgers Band 
Legends Of American Music, Volume 1 - Melody Thread 2012 - Produced by Johnny Rodgers Band

Let's Make A Date - Melody Thread 2008 - Produced by Richard Barone

Bound Together - Melody Thread 2008 - Produced by Richard Barone

Box of Photographs - PS Classics 2005 - Produced by Richard Barone

Vocal Performance/Co-written Songs 
Liza's At The Palace "I Would Never Leave You" - Hybrid Recordings 2008

Liza's At The Palace "ACT II" - Hybrid Recordings 2008

Hallways: the Songs of Carol Hall "Change In Me" - LML Music 2008

Sweethearts: Multi-Artist Pop Hits Vol 1 "Special Light" - Oceanlight Records 2008

Jule Styne in Hollywood "Brooklyn Bridge"- PS Classics 2006

3 Men and a Baby...Grand, Salute the Rat Pack - LML Music 2006

Little Kisses, co-written & performs - Jolie Jones Music 2006

Maury Yeston Song Book "Danglin" - PS Classics 2003

Johnny Rodgers Band/Johnny Rodgers, producer 
In Good Company - Lee Lessack LML Music 2005

Waiting for the Glaciers to Melt - Brian Lane Green LML Music 2005

Johnny Rodgers, producer/arranger/orchestrator/music supervisor/songwriter 
Motherhood the Musical - Cast Recording, Sue Fabisch Mommy Music 2011

Awards and nominations
 Runner up 2011 - Song of the Year, "Lord Let The Angels Sing"
 Winner 2011 - Bistro Award - Johnny Rodgers Band, Outstanding Musical Group
 Nominated 2011 - Carbonell Musical Theatre Award - Musical Direction "Motherhood the Musical"
 Winner 2010 - Great American Song Contest, "One More Moment"
 Winner 2010 - Nightlife Award, Outstanding Jazz Vocalist
 Selected 2010 - Rhythm Road Music Ambassador by US Dept of State & Jazz at Lincoln Center
 Winner 2009 - United Kingdom Song Contest Winner "The Best Of You In Me"
 Winner 2009 - Unisong International Song Contest for Performance "Bound Together"
 Winner 2008 - ASCAP Foundation Song Writer Award
 Winner 2008 - 15th Annual Billboard World Song Contest - Americana/Folk category "Home to Mendocino"
 Winner 2008 - Fans voted "Midday Moon" #1 Jazz song on OurStage.com in Jazz channel
 Winner 2008 - Fans voted "The Best Of You In Me" #1 on OurStage.com in John Lennon Song Contest channel
 Selected 2008 - Armed Forces Entertainment
 Winner – Songwriter's Hall of Fame – Abe Oldman Award 2002 (Is It The Way?)
 Winner – BackStage Bistro Award – Outstanding New York Début 2002
 Winner – Best One Man Show – Show Business Weekly
 Winner – MAC Award – Best Male New York Début 2002

References

External links 
 

1974 births
Living people
Musicians from Miami
Singer-songwriters from Florida
American male pianists
21st-century American male singers
21st-century American singers
21st-century American pianists
American male singer-songwriters